Li Xianhua (born 1962) is a Chinese geologist currently serving as researcher and doctoral supervisor at the Institute of Geology and Geophysics, Chinese Academy of Sciences (CAS).

Education
Li was born in Nanjing, Jiangsu in 1961, while his ancestral home in Cangnan County, Zhejiang. After the resumption of college entrance examination, he entered University of Science and Technology of China, where he graduated in 1983. He received his master's degree and doctor's degree from the Institute of Geochemistry, Chinese Academy of Sciences (CAS) in 1985 and 1988, respectively.

Career
He is now a researcher and doctoral supervisor at the Institute of Geology and Geophysics, Chinese Academy of Sciences (CAS).

Honours and awards
 2007 Fellow of the American Gem Society (AGS)
 2011 Science and Technology Award of the Ho Leung Ho Lee Foundation
 2011 State Natural Science Award (Second Class) 
 November 22, 2019 Member of the Chinese Academy of Sciences (CAS)

References

External links
 Li Xianhua on the Institute of Geology and Geophysics, Chinese Academy of Sciences (CAS) 

1961 births
Living people
Scientists from Nanjing
University of Science and Technology of China alumni
Chinese geologists
Members of the Chinese Academy of Sciences